The Emporia State–Washburn football rivalry, commonly referred to as the Turnpike Tussle, is an American college football rivalry game played annually between the Emporia State Hornets football team of Emporia State University from Emporia, Kansas, and the Washburn Ichabods football team of Washburn University from Topeka, Kansas. Both schools currently compete in the NCAA Division II level, and are members of the Mid-America Intercollegiate Athletics Association (MIAA). Emporia State currently leads the series 59–53–2. The Turnpike Tussle is the second-oldest active NCAA Division II rivalry.

Prior to joining the MIAA (Washburn in 1989, Emporia State 1991), both schools have competed in the same conferences with the exception of 1935 to 1940 when Washburn was a member of the Missouri Valley Conference.

History 
Emporia State University opened its doors in 1863 as the Kansas State Normal School, with Washburn University opening its doors two years later in 1865 as the Lincoln College. Washburn's football program began in 1891 and Emporia State began two years later, with the first football game between the two schools taking place on November 4, 1899 in Topeka where Emporia State won 11–0. After a one-year hiatus, the rivalry began again playing annually until 1942 when World War II took place. During those 42 seasons, Washburn started out with a strong lead in the series winning eight of the next nine games before Emporia State took the majority of the wins those years. The teams tied six times prior to WWII.

Ten years after World War II finished, the Kansas Turnpike was completed, forming a 58 mile distance between the two schools and led the two schools to name their rivalry series the "Turnpike Tussle" in 1956. The series winning streaks began alternating around every five years or so after the War until 1991 when Emporia State began the longest winning streak in the series – 11 games from 1991 to 2001. The turn of the century brought new leadership for both teams. In 2001, Emporia State promoted offensive coordinator Dave Wiemers as their head coach, who later resigned in December 2006. On December 28, 2001, Washburn hired Craig Schurig as the next head coach, who remains the head coach. In December 2006, former ESU quarterback, Garin Higgins, was named the next Hornet football coach, who remains as the head coach.

Game results 

Source:

See also
List of NCAA college football rivalry games

References 

College football rivalries in the United States
Emporia State Hornets football
Washburn Ichabods football
1899 establishments in Kansas